Butvydas or Pukuveras ( (Budzivid); also known as Боудивидъ, Liutauras, Пукувер (Pukuvier) Pukuwer or Pucuwerus) (died 1295) was the Grand Duke of Lithuania from 1292 to 1295. His influence was strong during his brother Butigeidis's reign. This led some historians to believe, that they were co-rulers, much like the grandsons Algirdas and Kęstutis. During his short reign Butvydas tried to defend the duchy against the Teutonic Knights; he also attacked Masovia, an ally of the knights. He was a direct ancestor of the Gediminids.

See also 
family of Gediminas – family tree of Butvydas
Gediminids

References

 

13th-century births
1295 deaths
Year of birth unknown
13th-century Lithuanian nobility
Lithuanian monarchy
Grand Dukes of Lithuania
Gediminids